Vera Stroyeva (21 September 1903 – 26 August 1991) was a Soviet film director and screenwriter. She directed 13 films between 1930 and 1970. Her film Boris Godunov was screened out of competition at the 1987 Cannes Film Festival.

Selected filmography
 His Excellency (1928)
 Boris Godunov (1954)
 Khovanshchina (1959)

References

External links

1903 births
1991 deaths
Soviet film directors
Soviet screenwriters
Film people from Kyiv
Belarusfilm films
20th-century screenwriters